Oddball (extended to Oddball and  the Penguins in some regions) is a 2015 Australian family film directed by Stuart McDonald. It was released in September 2015 and stars Shane Jacobson, Coco Jack Gillies, Sarah Snook and Alan Tudyk. It is based on a true story.

Plot
On Middle Island off the coast of Warrnambool, Fairy Penguins have made their home, but foxes have found the island and had reduced the population of penguins. Emily Marsh (Sarah Snook) walks on the island counting the minimal number of penguins left after another attack by foxes, along with her co-workers Zoe (Tegan Higginbotham), Paul Watt (John Leary) and her friend Jack Jones (Richard Davies). Meanwhile, an eccentric chicken farmer named Swampy Marsh (Emily's estranged father played by Shane Jacobson) is seen walking through his barn full of chickens and then feeding his two dogs, Missy and Oddball, breakfast.

Elsewhere in the centre of Warrnambool, 9-year-old Olivia Marsh (Emily's daughter and Swampy's granddaughter played by Coco Jack Gillies) packs her lunch and opens a gift from her mother's love interest Bradley Slater (Alan Tudyk), of whom she and Swampy disapprove. As she gets driven to school by Swampy, accompanied by the mischievous Oddball, and tries to get out, Oddball jumps out and wreaks havoc all over Warrnambool, eventually destroying a tourism attraction Bradley is attempting to set up. In the courthouse later in the day, Oddball is given one last chance at behaving or he will get put down if he enters the city again. That night Swampy finds an injured penguin which has been attacked by a fox on Middle Island and takes him back to his house, where a fox attempts to eat it but is scared off by Oddball. Surprised by Oddball's sudden change in his ability to protect other animals, and realising that someone might be sabotaging the island to turn it into a whale-watching station, he comes up with an idea to save the dwindling number of penguins. Olivia agrees with the idea enthusiastically and names the injured penguin 'Pocket'. They begin training Oddball and eventually convince Emily to go on a holiday to Melbourne with Bradley, where he proposes that they and Olivia move to New York City. While Emily and Bradley are away, Olivia and Swampy sleep on Middle Island for the night so they can see if Oddball is up to the challenge. They also release the now healed Pocket back into the wild. Upon seeing that Oddball successfully guards the penguins Swampy decides to put Oddball on the island alone for a night to see how he copes.

After Oddball successfully fends off a fox and protects Pocket and his Significant other, he and Olivia decide that the dog can guard the birds nightly. After the penguin numbers are steadily rising, Emily finds out about Swampy's plan after Olivia accidentally blurts it out. Emily eventually approves and warns that Oddball could get into trouble if the council finds out. Swampy assumes that Bradley is sabotaging the penguins because Bradley is so eager about a whale watching idea formed by a man named Rich (Jason Geary). The whale watching station would supplant the penguin sanctuary. That night after going home from dropping Oddball off to the island, Oddball tries to fend off a decoy fox and gets shot by a tranquilizer gun off-screen by an unknown person. Swampy accuses Emily of running away after she proposes following through with Bradley's plan of moving away with him and Olivia and says that the sanctuary is done. Outraged and offended by her father's comments, Emily says that she put more effort into the penguin sanctuary than he did when her mum died. Swampy later finds Oddball in the back of the animal control van where he finds a matching wound to a tranquilizer dart. The animal catcher (Frank Woodley) says to Swampy that he can't save Oddball and drives off after letting him have one last moment with the dog. After finding out that Pocket and his female friend have laid an egg, he teams up with Olivia to save Oddball. Emily and Jack go to Jack's house and find some of his tranquilizer guns, fox cages and tranquilliser darts missing.

After saving Oddball, Swampy and Olivia meet Emily and the slightly drugged Jack (from a dart gun accident) at the beach connecting to Middle Island. Oddball and Olivia sneak to the island and are followed by the worried Emily and Swampy. Oddball finds the person sabotaging the island releasing a fox. After a brief confrontation Emily calls out to the person, assuming it is Bradley, to stop, but the person is actually revealed to be Zoe. She explains that Rich, the whale watch station promoter, is her boyfriend and wants the whale-watching plan to go through, just so she can get out of her job which she secretly hated. She then grabs Pocket's egg and attempts to stomp on it but is stopped when Emily and Olivia tackle her. Emily accidentally kicks the egg off the cliff but it stops before it can reach the sea. Zoe is shot with a tranquilizer dart by Jack, and Oddball carefully retrieves the egg with guidance from Swampy, Emily and Olivia. Emily dismisses Bradley's idea to move away and reconciles with Swampy. The sanctuary is saved and the Maremma conservation project is approved.

Cast

Production
This is a dramatisation based on true events. The dog used both in the true event and in the dramatized film is a Maremma Sheepdog. The original conservation project in which Maremma sheepdogs were trained to defend the penguins from foxes began in 2006.

Release
The film had its North American premiere at the opening weekend of Indianapolis's Heartland Film Festival in October, 2015 and opened the Toronto International Film Festival for Kids in 2016. It was an Official Selection, playing opening weekend at Chicago International Children's Film Festival, Sedona International Film Festival, Sonoma Film Festival, Environmental Film Festival in the Nation's Capital in Washington D.C., Cleveland Film Festival, Dallas International Film Festival, Miami International Film Festival, Newport Beach Film Festival, Wisconsin Film Festival, Mill Valley Film Festival, and Traverse City Film Festival, among others. It also received a screening at Utah's Tumbleweeds Film Festival and Palm Springs International Film Festival.

The film was released internationally in Bolivia, Italy, New Zealand, Poland, Slovenia and the United Kingdom (Icon Film Distribution).

Reception

Critical response
Oddball received positive reviews from critics. On Rotten Tomatoes the film has an approval rating of 87% based on reviews from 23 critics.

Luke Buckmaster of The Guardian wrote "Some kinks in the writing notwithstanding, Oddball is fun and thoughtfully minded, with a sweet charm that endears from the get-go." Erin Free of Filmink wrote "Oddball'''s brand of fun-with-heart will hopefully click with local kids and their parents too." 
Matt Neal of "The Standard" gave a positive review, saying "You'd have to be heartless to hate Oddball."

Jake Wilson of the Sydney Morning Herald gave a negative review, writing "Unfortunately, they appear to have lost sight of the golden rule for family movies of this type, which is to keep the focus squarely on the animals or, failing that, on the kids." Sandra Hall, also of the Sydney Morning Herald, wrote "Jacobson is so intent on its efforts to firm up Swampy's credentials as an impractical but inspired eccentric that he's in danger of turning him into a gormless irritant."

Box office
The Australian box office return for Oddball hit A$11,085,092 in 2015 from a production budget of A$7,000,000. On limited release through Village Roadshow (Australia) on September 17, 2015, the film grossed nearly A$1m from 289 theatre screens on its opening weekend, ranking 5th in Australia for all films. It rose to #4 the following weekend, taking nearly A$1.8m and expanding to 293 theatres. Peaking on the first weekend in October it was ranked #3 and viewing at 297 venues. The film ran exclusively on Village Roadshow for 12 weeks until late November.

The film is ranked on Screen Australia's "Films Most popular in their Own Backyard" as #6 and on their "100 Most Popular Australian Films" list as #26.

Accolades

Home media
The film was released on DVD, Blu-ray and video on demand platforms in Australia on 16 December 2015.

References

External links

 Official website
 Oddball at Internet Movie Database
 Oddball at Rotten Tomatoes
 Donnison, John, "The dogs that protect little penguins", BBC News Online''. 14 December 2015.

Australian children's films
2015 films
2010s children's adventure films
Australian films based on actual events
Films about animal rights
Films about dogs
Films about penguins
Films scored by Cezary Skubiszewski
Films set in Victoria (Australia)
Films shot in Melbourne
2010s children's films
2010s adventure films
2010s English-language films
Screen Australia films
Roadshow Entertainment films
2015 directorial debut films